The Unfair Sex is a 1926 American silent drama film directed by Henri Diamant-Berger and starring Hope Hampton, Holbrook Blinn and Nita Naldi.

Cast
 Hope Hampton as Shirley Chamberlain 
 Holbrook Blinn as Don Calvert 
 Nita Naldi as Blanchita D'Acosta 
 Walter Miller as William Emerson

References

Bibliography
 Munden, Kenneth White. The American Film Institute Catalog of Motion Pictures Produced in the United States, Part 1. University of California Press, 1997.

External links

1926 films
1926 drama films
Silent American drama films
Films directed by Henri Diamant-Berger
American silent feature films
1920s English-language films
Associated Exhibitors films
American black-and-white films
1920s American films